Jimmy Matthew Herget (born September 9, 1993) is an American professional baseball pitcher for the Los Angeles Angels of Major League Baseball (MLB). He previously played in MLB for the Cincinnati Reds and  Texas Rangers.

Career

Amateur
Herget attended Jefferson High School in Tampa, Florida and was drafted by the Atlanta Braves in the 40th round of the 2012 MLB draft. He did not sign with the Braves and played college baseball at the University of South Florida. In 2014, he played collegiate summer baseball with the Bourne Braves of the Cape Cod Baseball League. In 2015, as a junior, he went 10–3 with a 2.92 ERA in 17 games (16 starts). After his junior year, Herget was drafted by the Cincinnati Reds in the 22nd round of the 2015 MLB draft.

Cincinnati Reds
Herget made his professional debut with the Billings Mustangs and spent all of 2015 there, posting a 3–0 record with a 3.20 ERA and 26 strikeouts over  innings. In 2016, he played for the Daytona Tortugas where he compiled a 4–4 record, 1.78 ERA, and 83 strikeouts in  innings. In 2017, he played for both the Pensacola Blue Wahoos and Louisville Bats, pitching to a combined 4–4 record with a 2.90 ERA and 72 strikeouts over 62 innings. He represented the Reds at the 2017 All-Star Futures Game. He spent 2018 back with Louisville, going 1–3 with a 3.47 ERA and 65 strikeouts over  innings. The Reds added Herget to their 40-man roster after the 2018 season. He returned to Louisville to begin 2019, and went 3–4 with a 2.91 ERA and 68 strikeouts over  innings for them. 

On July 1, 2019, the Reds promoted Herget to the major leagues. He made his debut on July 7, allowing 3 runs over  innings pitched. He pitched 6.1 innings for the Reds in 2019, posting a 4.26 ERA. Herget was designated for assignment on November 25, 2019.

Texas Rangers
On December 2, 2019, Herget was claimed off waivers by the Texas Rangers from the Cincinnati Reds. Herget was designated for assignment on December 21, 2019. He was outrighted on January 9, 2020. On July 31, 2020, Herget’s contract was selected to the 40-man roster. On December 2, 2020, Herget was non-tendered by Texas. On December 11, 2020, Herget signed a major league deal with the Rangers. On February 16, 2021, Herget was designated for assignment by Texas after they acquire Josh Sborz. On February 20, Herget was outrighted and invited to Spring Training as a non-roster invitee. On August 1, Texas selected his contact to the active roster, after opening the season with the Round Rock Express. After giving up 4 runs in 4 innings pitched, Herget was designated for assignment on August 13. He became a free agent on August 15.

Los Angeles Angels
On August 16, 2021, Herget signed a minor league contract with the Los Angeles Angels. He was then assigned to the Triple-A Salt Lake Bees. After making 4 appearances with Salt Lake, going 0-1 with a 13.50 ERA and 5 strikeouts, the Angels selected Herget's contract on August 31, 2021.

References

External links

South Florida Bulls bio

1993 births
Living people
Baseball players from Tampa, Florida
Major League Baseball pitchers
Cincinnati Reds players
Texas Rangers players
Los Angeles Angels players
South Florida Bulls baseball players
Bourne Braves players
Billings Mustangs players
Daytona Tortugas players
Pensacola Blue Wahoos players
Louisville Bats players
Round Rock Express players
Thomas Jefferson High School (Tampa, Florida) alumni